A tin-based perovskite solar cell is a special type of perovskite solar cell, where the lead is substituted by tin. It has a tin-based perovskite structure (ASnX3), where 'A' is a 1+ cation and 'X' is a monovalent halogen anion. The methylammonium tin triiodide (CH3NH3SnI3) has a band gap of 1.2–1.3 eV, while formamidinium tin triiodide has a band gap of 1.4 eV.

Tin-based perovskite solar cells are still in the research phase and there are relatively few publications about them, compared to their counterpart, lead-based perovskite solar cells. This is mainly due to the instability of the 2+ oxidation state of tin (Sn2+) in methylammonium tin iodide (CH3NH3SnI3), which can be easily oxidized to the more stable Sn4+, leading to a process called self doping, where the Sn4+ acts as a p-dopant leading to a reduction in the solar cell efficiency. Self-doping used to be believed to be caused by Sn vacancy defects; however, recent research indicates that this may not be complete. In CsSnI3, Cs vacancies are the primary contributors of holes leading to self-doping.

The maximum solar cell efficiency reported is 18.71% for methylammonium tin iodide (CH3NH3SnI3), 5.73% for CH3NH3SnIBr2, 3% for CsSnI3 (quantum dots of this material can yield efficiencies as high as 5.03%). and above 9%  for formamidinium tin triiodide (CH(NH2)2SnI3).

The main advantages of tin-based perovskite solar cells are that they are lead-free and that can help to further tune the band-gap of the active layer. There are environmental concerns with using lead-based perovskite solar cells in large-scale applications; one such concern is that since the material is soluble in water, and lead is highly toxic, any contamination from damaged solar cells could cause major health and environmental problems.

In spite of an earlier reported low efficiency, formamidinium tin triiodide may hold promise because, applied as a thin film, it appears to have the potential to exceed the Shockley–Queisser limit by allowing hot-electron capture, which could considerably raise the efficiency.

Self Doping Mitigation techniques

Several techniques have been explored as a means of counteracting the self-doping of Sn-based perovskites. One method is the sealing of cells so that they are not exposed to oxygen. Techniques that have been used to seal the cells include atomic layer deposition, roll lamination, using a heat sealer, and covering with glass sealed with adhesives cured by ultraviolet light. Materials that have been used for this purpose include polymers such as poly(methyl methacrylate). 

Another option is adding reducing agents such as tin halides to the environment in which tin-based perovskite thin films are deposited to reduce perovskite oxidation. They also act as a source of Sn, diminishing the likelihood of Sn vacancies (and, therefore, holes) forming; this improves the thin film structure. Additional reducing agents include powdered Sn, gallic acid, and N2H4. Adding certain organic compounds to precursor solutions can lead to the reduction of tin halides to metallic Sn, which can act as a sink for Sn(IV) ions formed during perovskite processing.

A similar method is including a step in the perovskite film processing which removes Sn(IV) ions. This can be accomplished by coating the perovskite film with a material such as formamidinium hydrochloride (FACl) that forms a complex with Sn(IV) ions which can then be removed by heating to temperatures below 60C. As long as the temperature to vaporize the complex is below that at which the perovskite loses mass, the perovskite film will remain intact after this processing step, save for the Sn(IV) ions which have been removed. Another processing step which has been shown to reduce self-doping is annealing of perovskite films during deposition.

A final possibility is improving the perovskite design itself to mitigate self-doping. One technique which can be used for this purpose in hybrid organic-inorganic perovskites is increasing the size of the organic component, which is believed to create a physical barrier to diffusion of oxygen. Increasing the size of the organic cation of the perovskite (but not making it so large that a layered structure forms) has the additional benefit of decreasing the bulk Sn defect density, eliminating a site which impedes charge carrier motion and lowers efficiency.

References

Perovskites
Solar cells